Ultimate Magic is Singapore’s first permanent illusion show at The Arena @ Clarke Quay. The show was Singapore’s only magic attraction and it was officially endorsed as a live attraction by the Singapore Tourism Board.

Background
Produced and managed by Concept: Magic, Singapore’s only full service magic production house, the show opened in September 2008 and started its third season, Ultimate Magic: The Revolution on 2 May 2009 and ended in August 2009.

Synopsis
Ultimate Magic starred Singapore professional magic duo, J C Sum & 'Magic Babe' Ning. The show is a partnership between the co-stars, Sum and Ning. The show is described as “Urban Illusions in the City” and is a magical personification of the characteristics of Singapore city.

Stars
Sum and Ning's partnership as a professional magic duo has been acknowledged as “very groundbreaking and refreshing” and they were said to represent “the new faces of an age-old art form”.  They are best known for a teleportation feat across Singapore River where three volunteers were teleported across Singapore River in just 2.5 seconds.

Illusions in the show
Original illusions in the show (all seasons) include:
J C's cross country teleportation
Crystal Metamorphosis – J C & Ning's instant double teleportation
Revollusion – An illusion with an 8-ft industrial fan
Dreamscape: The Realm of Sandman
Extreme Burn – An escape from a flaming spear

External links
Ultimate Magic

Related videos
Singapore's first permanent illusion show "Ultimate Magic" video trailer
Singapore Magic tourist attraction and first daily illusion show "Ultimate Magic: The Revolution"
“Ultimate Magic” - AsiaOne Video
Revollusion fan illusion by 'Magic Babe' Ning and J C Sum, Asia's most lethal combination in magic - Youtube Video
'Magic Babe' Ning and J C Sum Crystal Metamorphosis - see-through substitution trunk illusion - Youtube video

References

Magic shows
Entertainment in Singapore
2008 establishments in Singapore
2009 disestablishments in Singapore